Naval Hospital Boston was a hospital in Chelsea, Massachusetts. With the closure of the nearby Boston Navy Yard, the hospital closed in 1974.

History
On January 7, 1836 the Chelsea Naval Hospital was completed and commissioned. The original building was built of Vermont granite. The hospital was a three-story building with a 100-bed capacity. A wing was added on the west side of the building in 1865.

Chelsea Naval Hospital was one of the first three hospitals authorized by Congress to accommodate naval personnel. Previously, personnel received treatment at marine hospitals operated by the Department of the Treasury for mariners, both naval and merchant. The hospital served naval personnel and others during the American Civil War, Spanish–American War, World War I and World War II.

In 1970, a plaque in remembrance of Medal of Honor recipient Wayne Maurice Caron, a hospital corpsman, was placed on the grounds of the hospital. In 1973, the hospital and the surrounding grounds were added to the Naval Hospital Boston Historic District.

Notable patients during the hospital's history include Presidents John Quincy Adams (after his presidency) and John F. Kennedy (before his presidency). The original hospital buildings were converted into condominiums while adjacent land was dotted with single family townhouses and high rise apartment complexes. Still extant are the perimeter wall and guard shack, pier, chapel, ordnance buildings, nurses' quarters, and the Captain's House. In addition to the redevelopment of the housing and hospital portion of the property, several acres on the Mystic River were taken over by the Metropolitan District Commission for Mary O'Malley Park.

See also
 List of military installations in Massachusetts

References

External links
http://www.olgp.net/chs/hospital/naval.htm
http://www.nps.gov/nr/travel/maritime/nav.htm

Medical installations of the United States Navy
Hospital buildings completed in 1836
Hospital buildings completed in 1865
Hospitals in Suffolk County, Massachusetts
Chelsea, Massachusetts
Installations of the United States Navy in Massachusetts
Defunct hospitals in Massachusetts
1836 establishments in Massachusetts
1974 disestablishments in Massachusetts
Military installations closed in 1974
National Register of Historic Places in Chelsea, Massachusetts
Closed installations of the United States Navy